Antonio Stankov (born 19 February 1991) is a Dutch-Macedonian professional footballer who plays as a right-back. He formerly played for Roda JC Kerkrade, FC Oss, MVV Maastricht, Viborg FF, Vejle BK, Achilles '29, Dordrecht and Pyunik.

Career

Club
On 2 July 2020, FC Pyunik announced that Stankov had left the club after his contract had expired.

International
At international level he has played for the U-21 Macedonian national team since 2009 till 2012, and has been capped 20 times (3 times in 2009 and 2011 and 7 times in 2010 and 2012).

Personal life
He is the twin brother of professional footballer Aleksandar Stankov.

Career statistics

Club

References

 Gotfredsen og Stankov forlader Viborg, bold.dk, 26 May 2016

External links
 Voetbal International profile 
 Macedonian Football
 

1991 births
Living people
Sportspeople from Štip
Association football fullbacks
Macedonian footballers
North Macedonia under-21 international footballers
Roda JC Kerkrade players
TOP Oss players
MVV Maastricht players
Viborg FF players
Vejle Boldklub players
Achilles '29 players
FC Dordrecht players
FC Pyunik players
Eerste Divisie players
Danish 1st Division players
Armenian Premier League players
Macedonian expatriate footballers
Expatriate footballers in the Netherlands
Macedonian expatriate sportspeople in the Netherlands
Expatriate men's footballers in Denmark
Macedonian expatriate sportspeople in Denmark
Expatriate footballers in Armenia
Macedonian expatriate sportspeople in Armenia